Macromia urania is a species of dragonfly in the family Macromiidae found in China, Hong Kong, Japan, Taiwan, and Vietnam. Its natural habitat is rivers, where it is threatened by habitat loss.

References

Macromiidae
Insects described in 1916
Taxonomy articles created by Polbot